Thomas G. Lane is a computer scientist dedicated to open-source software. In a 2000 survey, he was listed as one of the top 10 contributors to an intended-to-be-representative sample of open-source software, having contributed 0.782% of the total code.

Lane's contributions to open-source include:

 Organizer of the Independent JPEG Group (IJG),
 Member of the core steering committee of PostgreSQL
 Co-author of the Portable Network Graphics (PNG) specification
 Member of the Tagged Image File Format (TIFF) advisory committee
 Contributor to the Ptolemy Project

Biography
Lane holds a Doctor of Philosophy (Ph.D.) in computer science from Carnegie Mellon University, awarded in 1990. He occasionally lectures there, and at other places. He has worked for Hewlett-Packard, Structured Software Systems, Great Bridge, Red Hat, Salesforce, and Crunchy Data.

In July 2000, Lane was employed by Great Bridge, one of the first PostgreSQL support companies. However, the firm was dissolved in September 2001 and he moved to Red Hat, a competitor of Great Bridge at the time, to develop their version of PostgreSQL named Red Hat Database. The Red Hat Database project was later cancelled, but Lane continued to work there to develop PostgreSQL. Between May 2013 and October 2015, he worked at Salesforce.com. In 2015, Lane began working for Crunchy Data to allow more time to support the PostgreSQL community. Lane is part of the PostgreSQL core team.

PostgreSQL
Lane is a member of the core PostgreSQL development team. He is involved in all aspects of PostgreSQL, including new features, performance improvements, and bug evaluating and fixing.

Image formats

Independent JPEG Group
The Independent JPEG Group (IJG) is an informal group that writes and distributes a widely used free library for JPEG image compression. The IJG is arguably one of the important early open source groups and a major reason why the JPEG image format is a standard.

The IJG develops and maintains libjpeg, a library written entirely in C which contains a widely used implementation of a JPEG decoder, JPEG encoder and other JPEG utilities.

PNG
The original specification for the Portable Network Graphics (PNG), version 1.0, was written by Thomas Boutell and Lane, with contributions by many others.

Lane is a contributing editor for PNG Specification, version 1.1.

TIFF
Lane is a member of the Tagged Image File Format (TIFF) advisory committee.

Works
 Thomas G. Lane, JPEG FAQ
 Thomas G. Lane, PostgreSQL Concurrency Issues 
 Thomas G. Lane, User interface software structures
 Thomas G. Lane, Studying Software Architecture Through Design Spaces and Rules

Humor
 In disputing a JPEG patent claim: "The patent describes a three-way symbol classification; the closest analog in JPEG is a two-way classification. If the jury can count higher than two, the case will fail."
 In describing the attention to detail of another software company: "The Single Unix Spec says that getopt() is supposed to be defined by <unistd.h>, but I guess reading the spec closely is not a hobby in Redmond..."
 In contributing to: "The Only Coke Machine on the Internet" "Since time immemorial (well, maybe 1970) the Carnegie-Mellon CS department has maintained a departmental Coke machine which sells bottles of Coke for a dime or so less than other vending machines around campus. As no Real Programmer can function without caffeine, the machine is very popular..."
 On idiotic benchmark comparisons: "Try to carry 500 people from Los Angeles to Tokyo in an F-15. No? Try to win a dogfight in a 747. No? But they both fly, so it must be useful to compare them ... especially on the basis of the most simplistic test case you can think of. For extra points, use *only one* test case. Perhaps this paper can be described as "comparing an F-15 to a 747 on the basis of required runway length".

In modern culture
 Mentioned in the Doom 3 video game readme file
 Partly responsible for JPEG being standardized as the dominant computer image format on the World Wide Web

References

External links
JPEG
, Independent JPEG Group
Jpeg Faqs
Additional features for libjpeg

PostgreSQL
 Great Bridge Developers to Keynote Open Source Database Summit; Project Management, Transaction Processing On the Agenda Business Wire (October 24, 2000)
 PostgreSQL Core Team

Other
 Slashdot.org: Unsung Heroes of Open Source Software?
 He speaks hacker
 Dr. Dobb's Data Compression Newsletter, Issue 17, April 2001
 O'Reilly Open Source Convention 2002
 Mining Email Social Networks in Postgres

1955 births
Living people
People from Madrid
Carnegie Mellon University alumni
Hewlett-Packard people
American computer scientists
American computer programmers
Free software programmers